Borthwick is a hamlet, parish and stream in Midlothian, Scotland. The parish includes the 15th century Borthwick Castle, which is to the east of the village and the villages of Gorebridge and North Middleton. Nearby is Newtongrange in the parish of Newbattle.

The civil parish has an area of 9375 acres  and a population of 2,841 (in 2011).

Notable residents

Very Rev Thomas Turnbull was minister of the parish from 1734 to 1786.

Borthwick was the birthplace of the historian William Robertson.

See also
List of places in Midlothian
List of places in Scotland
Patrick Simson

References

External links

RCAHMS record for Borthwick, sometimes known as Locherworth parish
SCRAN images: Borthwick
GENUKI Genealogy: Borthwick
The Coal Authority website / coal mining search
Borthwick Castle website
Borthwick and District Pipe Band

Parishes in Midlothian
Villages in Midlothian
Civil parishes of Scotland